Savitri Devi Jindal (born 20 March 1950) is an Indian businesswoman and politician. She was the chairperson emerita of O.P. Jindal Group. She is also the president of Maharaja Agrasen Medical College, Agroha. Jindal family net worth is estimated to be $20.5 billion.

Biography 
Jindal was born in Tinsukia, Assam. She married Om Prakash Jindal in the 1970s, who had founded the Jindal Group, a steel and power conglomerate. Jindal was a Minister in the Haryana Government and a member of the Haryana Vidhan Sabha (Legislative Assembly) from Hisar constituency. She lost the seat in elections held in 2014 for the Haryana assembly. She became the chairperson after her husband, O.P. Jindal, who died in a helicopter crash in 2005. She is a member of the INC political party.

Savitri Jindal is the richest woman in India, and the 16th-richest Indian in 2016, worth over $4.0 billion; she also was the world's 453rd-richest person in 2016. She is the world's seventh-richest mother and contributes to the public work her husband started. She was conferred with Acharya Tulsi Kartritva Puraskar in 2008 by Akhil Bhartiya Terapanth Mahila Mandal.

Political life 
In 2005, Jindal was elected to the Haryana Vidhan Sabha from Hisar constituency, which was earlier represented by her late husband Om Prakash Jindal for a long time. In 2009, she was re-elected to the constituency and was appointed the cabinet minister in the Haryana Government on 29 October 2013.

In the previous cabinet, she had served as the Minister of State for Revenue and Disaster Management, Consolidation, Rehabilitation and Housing and also the Minister of State for Urban Local Bodies and Housing.

The revenue of the company quadrupled after she took charge of the company. With a background and history from the state of Haryana, she served as the member of Haryana Legislative Assembly and held the office of Minister of Power till 2010. O.P. Jindal group was started in 1952 by O.P. Jindal, an engineer by profession. It became the conglomerate of steel, power, mining, oil and gas. Each of these four divisions of her business is run by her four sons, Prithviraj, Sajjan, Ratan and Naveen Jindal. Jindal Steel is the third-largest producer of steel in India.

References 

.

1950 births
Living people
People from Tinsukia district
Female billionaires
Members of the Haryana Legislative Assembly
Indian billionaires
People from Hisar (city)
Indian National Congress politicians from Haryana
Businesspeople from Haryana
Indian women business executives
Indian business executives
20th-century Indian businesspeople
21st-century Indian businesspeople
21st-century Indian women politicians
21st-century Indian politicians
Businesswomen from Haryana
20th-century Indian businesswomen
21st-century Indian businesswomen
Jindal family
Women members of the Haryana Legislative Assembly